Dolginka is a rural locality (a settlement) in Ternovskoye Rural Settlement, Novokhopyorsky District, Voronezh Oblast, Russia. The population was 90 as of 2010. There are 4 streets.

Geography 
Dolginka is located 57 km southwest of Novokhopyorsk (the district's administrative centre) by road. Tambovka is the nearest rural locality.

References 

Populated places in Novokhopyorsky District